Rhythm Sangwan is an Indian pistol shooter. She usually competes in 10 m Air Pistol and 25 m Pistol. She has won medals in Shooting World Cups and Shooting Championship at junior as well as at senior level.

References

External links 
Rhythm Sangwan at the International Sports Shooting Federation

2003 births
Living people
Indian sport shooters
Indian female sport shooters